Falling Down is a 1993 American action film directed by Joel Schumacher, written by Ebbe Roe Smith and released by Warner Bros. in the United States on February 26, 1993. The film stars Michael Douglas in the lead role of William Foster, a divorced and unemployed former defense engineer. The film centers on Foster as he treks on foot across the city of Los Angeles, trying to reach the house of his estranged ex-wife in time for his daughter's birthday. Along the way, a series of encounters, both trivial and provocative, causes him to react with increasing violence and make sardonic observations on life, poverty, the economy, and commercialism. Robert Duvall co-stars as Martin Prendergast, an aging Los Angeles Police Department sergeant on the day of his retirement, who faces his own frustrations even as he tracks down Foster.

Plot
William Foster is stuck in traffic on a hot day. After his air conditioning fails, he abandons his car and begins walking home across Los Angeles, carrying his briefcase.

At a convenience store, the Korean owner refuses to give change for a telephone call. Foster begins ranting about the high prices. The owner grabs a baseball bat and demands that Foster leave. Foster takes the bat and destroys much of the merchandise before leaving. Later, while resting on a hill, he is accosted by two gang members, who threaten him with a knife and demand his briefcase. Foster attacks them with the bat and takes their knife.

The gang members, now in a car with two friends, find Foster using a pay phone. They open fire, hitting several bystanders but not Foster. The driver crashes. Foster picks up a gun, shoots the one surviving gang member in the leg, and then leaves with their bag of weapons. Foster encounters a panhandler and gives him the briefcase, which only contains his lunch.

At a fast-food restaurant, Foster attempts to order breakfast, but they have switched to the lunch menu. After an argument with the manager, Foster pulls a gun and fires into the ceiling accidentally. After trying to reassure the frightened employees and customers, he orders lunch, but is annoyed when the burger looks nothing like the one on the menu. He leaves, tries to call from a phone booth, then shoots the booth to pieces after being hassled by an individual who was waiting to use the phone. After Foster calls "home" again and states his intention to attend his daughter Adele's birthday party, his ex-wife Beth notifies the police because she has a restraining order.

Sergeant Martin Prendergast, who is on his last day before retirement, insists on investigating. Interviews with witnesses lead Prendergast to suspect that the same person is responsible. Foster's "D-Fens" vanity license plate proves to be an important lead, because Prendergast remembers being in the same traffic jam as Foster earlier that day. Prendergast and his partner, Detective Sandra Torres, visit Foster's mother, who is surprised to learn that Foster lost his job. They realize Foster is heading toward his former family's home in Venice, California and rush to intercept him.

Foster passes a bank where a black man is protesting after being rejected for a loan. The man exchanges a glance with Foster and says, "Don't forget me," as he is escorted away by police. Foster stops at a military surplus store to buy boots. The owner, a white supremacist, diverts Torres's attention when she comes in. After Torres leaves, he offers Foster a rocket launcher and congratulates him for shooting "a bunch of niggers" at the restaurant. When Foster expresses distaste for the store owner's racism, the man attempts to turn him over to the police, but Foster stabs him in the shoulder then shoots him dead. Foster changes into army clothes, takes the rocket launcher, and leaves. 

Foster encounters a road repair crew who are not working and accuses them of doing unnecessary repairs to justify their budget. He pulls out the rocket launcher but struggles to use it, until a boy explains how it works. Foster accidentally fires the launcher, blowing up the construction site. By the time Foster reaches Beth’s house, she has already fled with Adele. He realizes that they may have gone to nearby Venice Pier, but Prendergast and Torres arrive before he can pursue them. Foster shoots Torres, injuring her, and flees with Prendergast in pursuit.

At the pier, Foster confronts his ex-wife and daughter. Adele is happy to see him, but Beth is frightened. Prendergast arrives and acknowledges Foster's complaints about being ill-treated by society, but does not accept that as an excuse for his rampage. With Foster distracted, Beth throws his gun into the sea as Prendergast draws his revolver, insisting that Foster give himself up. With nothing left for him, Foster tricks Prendergast into shooting him dead. Having asserted himself, Prendergast decides to hold off retirement.

Cast

Production

Development 
Falling Down was being shot on locations in Lynwood, California, when the 1992 Los Angeles riots began. By April 30, the riots were sufficiently disruptive to force filming to stop early that day. Film crews produced more footage inside of Warner Bros. Studio, in Burbank, as the riots continued. By May 4, when the crew intended to resume in Pasadena, initial requests to do so were denied, causing delays. Filming wrapped in late June 1992. Production designer Barbara Ling said, "We mapped this so that you really were going across [Los Angeles] from Silver Lake down to mid-city to Koreatown."

In an interview less than a week before Falling Downs release, screenwriter Ebbe Roe Smith gave his interpretation of what the movie was about. "To me, even though the movie deals with complicated urban issues, it really is just about one basic thing: The main character represents the old power structure of the U.S. that has now become archaic, and hopelessly lost. For both of them, it's adjust-or-die time..."

Casting 
Foster's signature haircut was the idea of Joel Schumacher and the movie's hairstylist, Lynda Gurasich. Douglas commented on how it helped him get into the character of a veteran of the military or defense industry, "It gave me the feeling of the late '50s and the early '60s, and somehow my character you kinda have the feeling that he came from another time, or he wished or he hoped for another time when things made sense." Douglas would add concerning the character, "There's a lot of people who are a paycheck away from being on the streets and being out of work who did everything right, they've been responsible, they tried hard, [and] they don't know what went wrong! We won the war, where's it all at?"

Reception

Box office 
The film grossed $96 million against a $25 million budget. It took the top spot at the United States box office in its first two weeks of release (February 26–28 and March 5–7, 1993). Falling Down pushed the previous top movie, Groundhog Day, into the second place box-office spot for both those weeks. It grossed $40.9 million in the United States and Canada and $55.1 million internationally.

Critical reception 
Falling Down holds an approval rating of 75% on Rotten Tomatoes based on 56 reviews, with an average rating of 6.80/10. The site's consensus states: "Falling Downs popcorn-friendly take on its complex themes proves disquieting—and ultimately fitting for a bleakly entertaining picture of one man's angry break with reality." However, the film also has a weighted average score of 56 out of 100 on Metacritic based on 21 critics, indicating "mixed or average reviews". Audiences surveyed by CinemaScore gave the film an average grade of "B" on an A+ to F scale.

Contemporary 
Contemporary reviews of Falling Down were generally mixed to positive.

Vincent Canby of The New York Times called it "the most interesting, all-out commercial American film of the year to date, and one that will function much like a Rorschach test to expose the secrets of those who watch it." Philip Thomas of Empire magazine wrote in his review of the film, "While the morality of D-Fens's methods are questionable, there's a resonance about his reaction to everyday annoyances, and Michael Douglas' hypnotic performance makes it memorable." James Berardinelli wrote: "Falling Down is replete with gallows humor, almost to the point where it could be classified as a 'black comedy'." John Truby calls the film "an anti-Odyssey story" about "the lie of the American Dream". He adds, "I can't remember laughing so hard in a movie." Kenneth Turan of the Los Angeles Times wrote that "Falling Down encourages a gloating sense that we the long-suffering victims are finally getting our splendid revenge. The ultimate hollowness of that kind of triumph reflects the shallowness of a film all too eager to serve it up."

Roger Ebert, who gave the film a positive review at the time of its release, wrote:

Some will even find it racist because the targets of the film's hero are African American, Latino, and Korean—with a few Whites thrown in for balance. Both of these approaches represent a facile reading of the film, which is actually about a great sadness, which turns into madness, and which can afflict anyone who is told, after many years of hard work, that he is unnecessary and irrelevant... What is fascinating about the Douglas character, as written and played, is the core of sadness in his soul. Yes, by the time we meet him, he has gone over the edge. But there is no exhilaration in his rampage, no release. He seems weary and confused, and in his actions he unconsciously follows scripts that he may have learned from the movies, or on the news, where other frustrated misfits vent their rage on innocent bystanders.

The Washington Post writer Hal Hinson observed:

This guy is you, the movie suggests, and if not you exactly, then maybe the guy you're one or two bad breaks from becoming. At one time or another, we've all thought these thoughts, and so when this downtrodden, laid-off, teed-off L.A. defense worker gets out of his car on a sweltering day in the middle of rush hour and decides he's not going to take any more, it comes as no surprise", adding "as he did in Fatal Attraction and Wall Street, Douglas again takes on the symbolic mantle of the Zeitgeist. But in Falling Down, he and Schumacher want to have their cake and eat it too; they want him to be a hero and a villain, and it just won't work.

Peter Travers of Rolling Stone gave the film four stars out of five, writing:

There's no denying the power of the tale or of Douglas's riveting performance—his best and riskiest since Wall Street. Douglas neither demonizes nor canonizes this flawed character. Marching across a violent urban landscape toward an illusory home, this shattered Everyman is never less than real ... "I'm the bad guy?" he asks in disbelief. Douglas speaks the line with a searing poignancy that illuminates uncomfortable truths without excusing the character. Schumacher could have exploited those tabloid headlines about solid citizens going berserk. Instead, the timely, gripping Falling Down puts a human face on a cold statistic and then dares us to look away.

Mick LaSalle said of the film in the San Francisco Chronicle:

A few times every year, Hollywood makes a mistake, violates formula, and actually makes a great picture. Falling Down is one of the great mistakes of 1993, a film too good and too original to win any Oscars, but one bound to be remembered in years to come as a true and ironic statement about life in our time.

At the time of its release, Douglas's father, actor Kirk Douglas, declared, "He played it brilliantly. I think it is his best piece of work to date." He also defended the film against critics who claimed that it glorifies lawbreaking: "Michael's character is not the 'hero' or 'newest urban icon'. He is the villain and the victim. Of course, we see many elements of our society that contributed to his madness. We even pity him. But the movie never condones his actions."

Falling Down was released in theatres less than one year after the 1992 Los Angeles riots, during which Korean Americans and their businesses were targeted by rioters. The Korean American Coalition and Korean Grocers Association protested the film for its treatment of minorities, especially the Korean grocer. Warner Bros. Korea cancelled the release of Falling Down in South Korea following boycott threats. The outcry by the Grocers Association led to Michael Douglas meeting with the organization's members at the Warner Bros. Studio because they "were there and they were pissed. So we had a conversation and I told them, 'Look, I'm very sorry, but there's a reason the screenwriter picked certain things to put in the film.'" Unemployed defense workers were also angered at their portrayal in the film.

The character of D‑FENS was featured on magazine covers, including the March 29, 1993 issue of Newsweek magazine, and reported upon as an embodiment of the "angry white man" stereotype.

Later opinions 
On the 25th anniversary of the film's release in 2017, film critic April Wolfe of LA Weekly wrote that it "remains one of Hollywood's most overt yet morally complex depictions of the modern white-victimization narrative, one both adored and reviled by the extreme right". Wolfe said "Today, we might see D-Fens and the white supremacist as the infighting sides of the far right — one couches racism in coded words like "thug," while the other wants an outright ethnic cleanse. Ultimately, what both want is to return to their idea of a purer America, unburdened by the concerns of minorities and women". Wolfe suggested that Rupert Murdoch would "go on to bottle that fury and package it as patriotism" in creating Fox News.

In 2012, Tasha Robinson of The A.V. Club was critical of the '90s film "that most stands out for me from that era, because it's such a ham-handed, wrong-headed, self-congratulatory attempt to encapsulate its era's spirit". Robinson added, "the film treats virtually everyone around him [D-Fens] as worthless, and presents his violence as the comedic payoff, turns it into a tone-deaf, self-pitying lament about the terrible persecution facing the oppressed majority in an era of political correctness and increasing multiculturalism." She finishes her short review with, "It's a profoundly hateful film disguised alternately (and erratically) as either tragedy or humor." An earlier 2008 review on the site was positive, saying, "Heat used as a metaphor for simmering rage is nothing new, but few films execute sweaty psychosis as well."

Accolades 
1993 Cannes Film Festival, Nominated for the Palme d'Or (Joel Schumacher)
1994 Edgar Award, Won for Best Motion Picture Screenplay (Ebbe Roe Smith)

In other media 
Falling Down has been the inspiration of musical artists such as Iron Maiden, Foo Fighters, Front Line Assembly, and Heart Attack Man. The Iron Maiden song "Man on the Edge" is a basic summary of Falling Down, beginning with describing the opening traffic jam, and ending with describing the birthday present Foster buys for his daughter. The Foo Fighters' song "Walk" has a music video that is a recreation of scenes from Falling Down. The Front Line Assembly album Millennium contains several samples from various scenes from Falling Down. The Heart Attack Man song "Out For Blood" was inspired by the anger and frustration weaved through Falling Down which weaves through the rest of their album Fake Blood.

In the video game Tony Hawk's American Wasteland, a character resembling Foster recreates the rocket launcher scene in a cutscene, blowing up a construction site before walking away with a duffel bag.

An episode of the animated series Duckman titled "A Room with a Bellevue" (episode six of season three), is loosely based on the plot of Falling Down. Duckman has to pick up his new suit from the dry cleaner to be presentable on his children's birthday, but huge traffic and the law are going to stop him.

Frank Grimes, a one-off character on The Simpsons episode "Homer's Enemy", is modeled after Foster, having the same flat-top haircut and white shirt and briefcase.

The band Slipknot sampled the famous "Freedom of Speech" clip in two songs - some earlier versions of "Gently", and "Interloper".

In the song "I'm in It", Kanye West refers to the film when he raps "Time to take it too far now/Michael Douglas out the car now".

Finnish band Beats and Styles referred to the movie poster with DJ Control holding a baseball bat instead of a shotgun for the cover of their 2009 album Schizosonics.

References

Further reading

External links 

 
 
 
 
 
 Falling Down Trailer

1990s American films
1990s English-language films
 1990s psychological thriller films
1993 films
American psychological thriller films
 1990s crime films
 1990s crime drama films
Neo-noir
Edgar Award-winning works
Fictional portrayals of the Los Angeles Police Department
Film controversies in South Korea
Films about consumerism
Films about dysfunctional families
Films about mother–daughter relationships
Films directed by Joel Schumacher
Films produced by Arnold Kopelson
Films scored by James Newton Howard
Films set in Koreatown, Los Angeles
Films set in Los Angeles
Race-related controversies in film
Regency Enterprises films
StudioCanal films
Warner Bros. films